Whitneyville Congregational Church may refer to:

Whitneyville Congregational Church (Hamden, Connecticut), listed on the National Register of Historic Places
Whitneyville Congregational Church (Whitneyville, Maine), listed on the National Register of Historic Places  in Washington County, Maine